Wallenius is a surname. Notable people with the surname include:

Allan Wallenius (1890–1942), Swedish leftist figure and journalist 
Asser Wallenius (1902–1971), Finnish speed skater and racing driver who competed in the 1924 Winter Olympics
Bror-Erik Wallenius (born 1943), Finnish sports commentator who works for Finland's National Broadcasting Company Yle
Kurt Martti Wallenius (1893–1984), Finnish Major General
Olof Wallenius (1902–1970), Swedish entrepreneur and the founder of Wallenius Lines
Ville Wallenius, Finnish guitarist who plays in the power metal band Twilightning

See also
Wallenius' noncentral hypergeometric distribution, generalization of the hypergeometric distribution where items are sampled with bias
Wallenius Lines, privately owned Swedish shipping company included in the Soya Group
Wallenius Wilhelmsen Logistics, privately owned Norwegian/Swedish shipping company
Zionts–Wallenius method, used to find a best solution to a multi-criteria optimization problem